Tim Kerkhof (born 13 November 1993) is a Dutch former professional racing cyclist.

Major results
2014
 1st  Road race, National Under–23 Road Championships
 8th Ronde Van Vlaanderen Beloften
2015
 1st  Mountains classification Driedaagse van West–Vlaanderen
2016
 5th Grand Prix Pino Cerami
2018
 4th Arno Wallaard Memorial
 7th Dwars door de Vlaamse Ardennen
 7th Overall Flèche du Sud

References

External links

1993 births
Living people
Dutch male cyclists
Sportspeople from Oss
Cyclists from North Brabant
21st-century Dutch people